Timothy Patrick Kelly (January 13, 1963 – February 5, 1998) was an American guitarist for the band Slaughter.

Career
Born in Trenton, New Jersey, Kelly was a self-taught guitar player and began his music career around the sixth grade.  He was inspired by other guitarists such as Rick Derringer and Peter Frampton. He played in a few bands during his career which included Hellion, NEWHAVEN, and Allegiance (that was fronted by his brother Bryan Kelly) along with other bands. After no real commercial success with these bands, he was chosen as guitarist for the group Slaughter which was formed in the fall of 1988.

With Slaughter, Kelly had many writing credits. On the first album of the band Stick It to Ya, he wrote and performed an instrumental piece called "Thinking of June" which he dedicated to his sister who died in 1982.  In all, Kelly released four studio albums with the band and two live albums, the last of which Eternal Live was released posthumously and includes a pictorial and video tribute to Kelly which was quickly put together by Blas Elias. Tim had been working on some songs, which two band mates refused to listen to, so he with Blas Elias worked on a separate project from Slaughter before his death.

Death
On February 5, 1998, Kelly was involved in a fatal car accident while traveling on Highway 96 in Arizona. Kelly's vehicle was hit head-on when an 18 wheeler crossed the middle line. Kelly was transported to a Bagdad, Arizona clinic where he was pronounced dead from internal injuries. At the time of the accident, the driver of the 18 wheeler was under the influence of at least three different drugs including amphetamines. He was later sentenced to three years in prison.

Kelly is buried at Saint Ignatius Cemetery in Pennsylvania.

References

External links
 
 

1963 births
1998 deaths
American heavy metal guitarists
American male guitarists
American heavy metal singers
Glam metal musicians
Singers from New Jersey
Musicians from Trenton, New Jersey
Road incident deaths in Arizona
Slaughter (band) members
Lead guitarists
20th-century American singers
Guitarists from New Jersey
20th-century American guitarists
20th-century American male musicians